Painkiller is a studio EP of ballads by recording artist Jim Bianco.  It was released on December 14, 2006.

Track listing
All songs were written by Jim Bianco.
 “Belong”– 3:16  
 “Somebody's Gonna Get Hurt"–3:38
“Painkiller” –2:59 
“Thundercloud”– 2:38 

Bonus short films by Jim Bianco:
“The March of Shibuya" 
"Best That You Can Do" 
A Drive Through Southport, England 
“Miranda"

Music video
Painkiller Live from My Kitchen (2008)

External links
Official website
Jim Bianco on MySpace
Jim Bianco on Facebook
Jim Bianco on Twitter
Jim Bianco's Youtube Channel

Jim Bianco albums
2006 EPs
Self-released EPs